Tuerta chrysochlora is a moth of the family Noctuidae. It is found in Burundi, Cameroon, the Democratic Republic of Congo, Equatorial Guinea, Gabon, Ghana, Nigeria and Sierra Leone.

References

Moths described in 1869
Agaristinae
Insects of the Democratic Republic of the Congo
Insects of West Africa
Fauna of the Republic of the Congo
Moths of Africa